A tubeteika is a Russian word for many varieties of traditional Central Asian caps. Tubeteikas are today worn in Tajikistan, Kazakhstan, Kyrgyzstan, and Uzbekistan, as well as in Muslim-populated regions of Russia (mainly Tatars) and Azerbaijan. The skullcap worn by Uzbeks and Uyghurs is called a doppa and has a square base. It was a popular headgear among children throughout the USSR during the 1940s and 1950s.  

Tubeteikas are worn typically by the Turkic ethnic groups of the region. It bears some superficial resemblance to the yurt, another Central Asian cultural icon.

The -ka at the end is a Russian diminutive suffix, as with shapka, ushanka and budenovka. In Turkmen, it is called tahiya ("taqiyah").

Doppa 

The Uzbek doppa or duppi is considered an applied art form and an important part of the traditional folk costume. Black with a flat, square base,  In Chust, Uzbekistan, the caps are made with white embroidery with "four arches [which] represent impenetrable gates that will keep all enemies at bay; the burning peppers protect against the evil eye; and the almonds or bodom are said to symbolise life and fertility".

Also, there is a trend among Sephardic and Moroccan Jews to wear Uzbeki tubeteikas as a kippah.

Gallery

References

External links 
 

Caps
Azerbaijani culture
Kazakhstani culture
Kyrgyzstani culture
Tajikistani culture
Tatar culture
Uzbekistani culture

tt:Түбәтәй